The Togian boobook or Togian hawk-owl (Ninox burhani) is an owl (Strigidae) described as new to science in 2004. The bird is currently known only from three islands in the Togian group, an archipelago in the Gulf of Tomini off the coast of Sulawesi, Indonesia. The new species was discovered on 25 December 1999.

The scientific name honours a local Indonesian conservationist called Burhan.

References 

 Indrawan, M. and S. Somadikarta (2004). A new hawk-owl from the Togian Islands, Gulf of Tomini, central Sulawesi, Indonesia. Bulletin of the British Ornithologists' Club 124:160-171
BirdLife Species factsheet Retrieved on 22 May 2007.

External links 
 BirdLife International

Ninox
Birds described in 2004
Endemic birds of Sulawesi